The Kindred is a 2021 British psychological horror film written by Christian J. Hearn and directed by Jamie Patterson that stars Samantha Bond, James Cosmo, Patrick Bergin, James Dreyfus, Blake Harrison and Robbie Gee. It was released on 26 August 2021.

Synopsis
Haunted by spirits after her father's suicide, an amnesiac woman discovers that he may have murdered her children.

Reception
On the review aggregator website Rotten Tomatoes, the film has an approval rating of 73%, based on 15 reviews, with an average rating of 6/10.

References

External links
 

2021 films
British horror films
2020s English-language films
2020s British films